Ajas is a village in Jammu and Kashmir, India.

AJAS or Ajas may refer to:

People
Christophe Ajas (born 1972), French footballer

Other uses
Adelaide Japanese Animation Society
African Journal of Aquatic Science
American Journal of Applied Sciences
American Journal of Arabic Studies
American Junior Academy of Sciences, a program of the National Association of the Academics of Science
Arkansas Junior Academy of Science
Asian-Australasian Journal of Animal Sciences
Association of Jewish Aging Services
Australasian Journal of American Studies

See also
AIAS (disambiguation)
Aja (disambiguation), for "Ajas" as plural of "Aja"